Jeremy Gray is an American politician, fitness instructor, and retired football player serving as a member of the Alabama House of Representatives from the 83rd district. He assumed office on November 7, 2018.

Early life and education 
Born in Opelika, Alabama, Gray graduated from Opelika High School. He earned a Bachelor of Science degree in sports management from North Carolina State University. As an undergraduate, Gray was a defensive tackle for the NC State Wolfpack football team.

Career 
From 2013 to 2015, Gray worked as a fitness instructor in Opelika. In 2015, he played as a cornerback for the Saskatchewan Roughriders. Gray later returned to Alabama, where he has since worked as a personal trainer and yoga instructor. Gray was elected to the Alabama House of Representatives and assumed office on November 7, 2018.

Gray has worked to lift a ban on yoga in Alabama schools.

References 

Living people
People from Opelika, Alabama
North Carolina State University alumni
NC State Wolfpack football players
Saskatchewan Roughriders players
Democratic Party members of the Alabama House of Representatives
African-American state legislators in Alabama
Year of birth missing (living people)